Robinson Ekspeditionen: 1998, was the first series of the Danish version of the Swedish show Expedition Robinson, first shown on 11 September 1998 and broadcast until 3 December 1998. The series is remembered for the all-girl alliance that took place following the second merge vote. Ultimately, it was Regina Pedersen who won over Karine Winther with an unknown jury vote. Contestants Gitte Schnell, Kathleen Kai-Sørensen and Jens Romundstad went on to become prominent television personalities in Denmark.

Finishing order

External links
http://www.bt.dk/nyheder/hvor-blev-de-af-robinson-1998
(Contestant Profiles)

Robinson Ekspeditionen seasons
1998 Danish television seasons